"Still Doll" is the debut single from singer and cellist Kanon Wakeshima. The song was used as the ending theme for the anime adaptation of the manga series Vampire Knight. The single peaked at number 33 on the Oricon singles chart.

Track listing

Personnel
 Kanon Wakeshima – Vocals, Cello, Piano, Lyrics, and a bunch of other instruments such as an oboe and a trumpet
 Mana – Production

References 

2008 debut singles
2008 songs
Kanon Wakeshima songs
Defstar Records singles
Anime songs
Song articles with missing songwriters